Maqbool Salmaan  is an Indian actor who appears in Malayalam films.

The son of television actor Ibrahimkutty and the nephew of actor Mammooty, Maqbool made his acting debut by playing a short role in A. K. Saajan's Asuravithu (2012). He later played the lead role in Aneesh Upasana's directorial debut film Matinee (2012).

Early life and family 
Maqbool Salmaan was born in Vaikom, Kottayam district, Kerala as the son of television actor P. I. Ibrahim Kutty and his wife Sameena. Maqbool has a sister, Tania Amjith. Maqbool attended the Labour India Gurukulam Public School, Marangattupilly, Kottayam. He graduated with a bachelor's degree in Hotel Management from the Oxford College, Bangalore. Being the nephew of film star Mammootty, Maqbool had a passion towards acting since his school days.

Career 
After completing his graduation, Maqbool decided to take up acting seriously. He never wanted to use his uncle's identity and fame to make his entry into cinema. So, like any other actor, he began appearing for auditions. He was chosen by Ranjan Pramod for a film; however, it failed to take off. He then approached director Fazil, who was looking for new faces for the film Living Together, but was rejected a role. He struggled for over a year to finally get a chance in a film by A. K. Saajan, who cast him in the lead role. When this project shelved due to some technical reasons, Saajan approached Maqbool again with the script of Asuravithu. who signed it without any hesitation. He was cast in a short but important role in this action flick which starred Asif Ali in the lead role. The film was not a commercial success. but Maqbool's performance garnered appreciation.

The acclaim Maqbool gained through Asuravithu helped still photographer Aneesh Upasana choose him for the lead role in Matinee, which would mark the latter's directorial debut. The film was produced by AOPL Entertainment, which had earlier that year successfully launched Maqbool's cousin Dulquer Salmaan through Second Show. Matinee opened to positive reviews from critics and audiences alike and was declared a hit. Maqbool also won positive feedback for his performance, with the critic from Rediff saying: "Maqbool's 'the guy next door' look in the film lend authenticity to the character he plays."

His third film was Parayan Baaki Vechathu, released in 2014, a political thriller by Karim, who had earlier directed Agni Nakshatram. Anumol was Maqbool's heroine in the film.
In 2018, he acted again with Mammootty  in Abrahaminte Santhathikal  in which he played a negative role.

Filmography

References

External links 
 
 

Indian male film actors
Male actors from Kerala
People from Vaikom
Living people
21st-century Indian male actors
Male actors in Malayalam cinema
1987 births